Alice Cobelli (born August 19, 1997 in Trento, Trentino-Alto Adige/Südtirol, Italy) is an Italian curler.

At the national level, she is a three-time Italian mixed doubles champion (2019, 2020).

Teams

Women's

Mixed doubles

Personal life
She is in a relationship with fellow curler Amos Mosaner.

References

External links

Alice Cobelli – OA Sport
Video: 

Living people
1997 births
Sportspeople from Trento
Italian female curlers
Italian curling champions